For lowercase or mixed case see Red (disambiguation).

RED (all in uppercase) may refer to:

Arts and Entertainment

Music
 R.E.D (Tiwa Savage album), 2015
 R.E.D. (Ne-Yo album), 2012
 R.E.D. (Rythmes Extrêmement Dangereux), 2015
 The R.E.D. Album, by Game
 "Red" (A.S. RED), by A.S. RED

Other
 RED, acronym for "Reliable Excavation Demolition", a playable gaming faction in Team Fortress 2

Business and media
 RED Distribution, a record distributor
 RED – 1404 AM, a university radio station for the University of Essex
 Xiaohongshu (RED App), a social & e-commerce app in China

Publications
 Review of Economic Dynamics, a macroeconomics journal

Technology 
 RED, random early detection, a queue management algorithm
 RED, reversed electrodialysis, an energy generation process
 Boris RED, a 3D compositing, titling, and effects application

Other uses
 Radio Equipment Directive (RED, EU directive 2014/53/EU)
 RED, national station code for Redruth railway station, Cornwall, England
 Redfern-Eveleigh-Darlington, a redevelopment scheme in Sydney, Australia

See also